Megamind: Mega Team Unite  is a 3D party video game based on the Megamind franchise, developed by THQ Studio Australia, and published by THQ. It launched on November 2, 2010 for the Nintendo Wii to coincide with the film's release. Its critical reception was generally negative.

Gameplay
The game is a beat-em up that supports up to 4 players. Players get to play as Megamind, Minion, Metro Man, and Tighten as a starting point for how the game will be. However, when beating each level, players get to pick characters that weren't shown in the final version of the film such as Destruction Worker, Psycho Delic, Conductor, Judge Sludge, and Hot Flash, who are known as the Doom Syndicate in the game. Each level consists of 9 rounds with over 50 minigames.

While most of the original film's cast were replaced with stand-in voice actors, Jonah Hill reprises his role as Hal Stewart / Tighten.

Plot
After Megamind becomes the hero of Metro City, he forms his own super hero squad, The Mega Squad, to defend the city from the Doom Syndicate. During this, the more they defeat the villains, the more the villains joins the Mega Squad. After defeating the Conductor, the last of the Doom Syndicate, chaos is averted and order has been prevailed. Megamind is victorious.

Reception 
Lena of Jeuxvideo.com rated the game 9/20 points, calling the content rickety and the game forgettable. Nintendo Official Magazine UK rated it 42/100 and called its gameplay "utterly boring". Patrick G. of GamingXP rated the game 78/100, calling the levels nice but criticizing how little it resembled the film.

References

External links 
 
 

2010 video games
Mega_Team_Unite
Video games based on films
Multiplayer and single-player video games
Wii games
Video games developed in Australia